Panthea coenobita is a species of moth of the family Noctuidae. It is found in North Europe, East Europe and Southern Europe, the central and northern European part of Russia, Japan, Korea, northern China, the Russian Far East (Primorye, Khabarovsk, Amur region, Sakhalin, southern Kuriles), southern and western Siberia (Transbaikalia, Baikal area, Altai) and Turkey.

The wingspan is 40–50 mm. The moth flies from May to July depending on the location.

The larvae feed on Pine, Fir and Larch.

External links

Fauna Europaea
Lepidoptera of Belgium
Lepiforum.de
Vlindernet.nl 

Pantheinae
Moths of Japan
Moths of Europe
Moths of Asia
Moths described in 1785
Taxa named by Eugenius Johann Christoph Esper